Charles B. Hedgcock (1887–1986) was an American football and basketball coach and college athletics administrator.

Hedgcock graduated from Knox College in Galesburg, Illinois in 1911. He began his career at Marshfield High School and Menominee High School in Menominee, Michigan, where he compiled a 39–5–3 record as football coach. Hedgcock returned to Knox in 1921 as the director of the physicals education department. He was in charge of all intramural athletics, served as an assistant coach in football and basketball under head coach Sam Barry, and was head coach of the baseball team.

In 1922, Hedgcock joined the faculty at Northern State Normal School (now known as Northern Michigan University) in Marquette, Michigan, as head of the department of health, physical education and recreation. He held that position for 34 years. He also served as Northern Michigan's coach of all sports for 11 years, and as head basketball coach for 22 years (1922–1942, 1945–1947) and head football coach for 14 years (1922–1933, 1936–1937). He retired in 1956. In 1943, he served at the War Training Service flight school in Escanaba, Michigan.

The physical education building at Northern Michigan was named the C.B. Hedgcock Fieldhouse after Hedgcock in 1964. Hedgccock was inducted into the Upper Peninsuala Sports Hall of Fame in 1975 and Northern Michigan Hall of Fame in 1976.

References

1887 births
1986 deaths
Knox Prairie Fire baseball coaches
Knox Prairie Fire football coaches
Knox Prairie Fire men's basketball coaches
Northern Michigan Wildcats athletic directors
Northern Michigan Wildcats football coaches
Northern Michigan Wildcats men's basketball coaches
Northern Michigan University faculty
High school football coaches in Michigan
Knox College (Illinois) alumni